Paolo Agostino Sperati (March 26, 1821 – May 20, 1884) was an Italian conductor, musician, and composer that was active in the theater and opera life of  Christiania (now Oslo), Norway in the 19th century.

Life and work
Sperati grew up in a family of musicians, and he made his debut as an organist at the age of nine in 1830. He became a military musician in Genoa in 1834, and from there moved to Nice, where he accompanied Paganini. He led a traveling ensemble in 1838 and 1839 that visited Marseille, where he met the conductor Pietro Negri, who engaged him in the opera in Berlin and then in Copenhagen (1841–1850) as conductor of the Italian Society at the Court Theater and the Royal Danish Theatre. They performed Danish premieres of works by Giuseppe Verdi and were commissioned by Christian VIII.

He then led the Italian opera troupe that brought the impresario Vincenzo Galli (1798–1858) to Norway in 1849, after he had spent a year at the Royal Swedish Opera. In Norway, Sperati was engaged as a conductor for the Christiania Theater (1850–1866) and the Kristiania Norwegian Theater (1852–1862). He conducted the Oslo Craftsmen's Choir (1854–1857) and the Freemason Choir (1883–1884), and he was an organist at the newly consecrated St. Olav's Cathedral (1856–1884).

Sperati became perhaps best known as the conductor of the 2nd Brigade Military Band (1854–1882), and in 1862 he was made a captain, in which capacity he enlisted the young Johan Halvorsen in 1881. Sperati worked at the Christiania People's Theater and the newly started Tivoli Opera (1882) until his death from a stroke on Easter Sunday, 1884. Sperati was friends with Henrik Ibsen and composed music for his play The Feast at Solhaug (1856). He also composed Skandinavisk Quadrille (Scandinavian Quadrille), a potpourri of six popular pieces.

Family
Sperati married a Danish woman, Sidsel Marie Nielsen (1823–1864), in 1847. While living in Copenhagen, they had two sons: Robert Ferdinand Arnold (1847–1884), who became a conductor and was later married to the actress Octavia Sperati, and Emmanuel (born 1850). After moving to Christiania, they had four more children: Wittorio (born 1853), who became a musician; Anna Giacinta (born 1856); Angelina Sicilia (born 1858), who became a teacher; and Carlo Alberto Sperati (1860–1943), who became a music professor.

After the death of his first wife, Paolo Sperati married his Danish housekeeper, Charlotte Mathilde Bendixen (1835–1906), in 1872. Together they had a son, Paolo Angelo Johannes (born 1869), who became a violinist.

References

1821 births
1884 deaths
Musicians from Turin
19th-century Italian composers
Italian conductors (music)
Italian expatriates in Denmark
Italian emigrants to Norway
Burials at the Cemetery of Our Saviour